Molecular Phylogenetics and Evolution is a peer-reviewed scientific journal of evolutionary biology and phylogenetics. The journal is edited by E.A. Zimmer.

Indexing
The journal is indexed in:
EMBiology
Journal Citation Reports
Scopus
Web of Science

External links

Elsevier academic journals
Evolutionary biology journals
Phylogenetics
Molecular biology
Publications established in 1992
Monthly journals